Bern is an unincorporated community in Bear Lake County, Idaho.  It is located in the southeast corner of the state, about four miles from Montpelier.

History
The first settlement at Bern was made in 1873. A post office called Bern was established in 1901, and remained in operation until 1988. The community was named after Bern, in Switzerland, the native land of a large share of the first settlers.

Bern's population was estimated at 50 in 1909, and was 20 in 1960.

Climate

According to the Köppen Climate Classification system, Bern has a warm-summer mediterranean continental climate, abbreviated "Dsb" on climate maps.

Notable people
La Monte Young, American music composer

References

Unincorporated communities in Idaho
Unincorporated communities in Bear Lake County, Idaho